Gulbarga Uttar Assembly seat is one of 224 assembly constituencies in Karnataka State, in India. It is part of Gulbarga (Lok Sabha constituency).

Assembly members 
 2008:	Qamarul Islam, Indian National Congress
 2013:	Qamarul Islam, Indian National Congress
 2018: Kaneez Fathima, Indian National Congress

See also
List of constituencies of the Karnataka Legislative Assembly
Gulbarga Assembly constituency

References

Assembly constituencies of Karnataka
Kalaburagi